Ramgarh is a census town and corresponding community development block in Kaimur district of Bihar, India. As of 2011, its population was 8,690, in 1,345 households. It was first upgraded to census town status for the 2011 census. The total population of the rural areas of Ramgarh block was 123,973, in 18,375 households. The overall population of the subdistrict was 132,663.

Geography 
Ramgarh block covers an area of 16,448 hectares, of which forests covered 3.2 in 2011. The area currently under cultivation that year was 13,249.7 hectares, while orchards covered another 284.8 hectares and pastures covered an additional 96.4. Another 1,726.1 hectares were under non-agricultural use.

Climate 
Ramgarh town gets about 1600 mm of rainfall per year on average. Temperatures typically vary from 6 to 45 degrees.

Demographics 
According to the 2011 census, the sex ratio of Ramgarh town was 927 females for every 1000 males, which was the highest among Kaimur district's three urban areas. Of the town's 8,690 people, 1,415 were between the ages of 0 and 6, and the sex ratio of this group was 1007 (i.e. there were more slightly girls than boys: 710 and 705, respectively). Members of scheduled castes made up 23.77% of Ramgarh residents, and there were no members of scheduled tribes living in the town. The literacy rate of Ramgarh town was 79.74%, which was lowest among urban areas in Kaimur district. Literacy was higher in men than in women: 87.96% of men and 70.73% of women in Kaimur town could read and write in 2011, with the corresponding 17.23% literacy gender gap being the highest in Kaimur.

Most of Ramgarh town's workforce was not employed in agriculture in 2011, with only 12.35% of workers being cultivators who owned or leased their own land, and 16.05% being agricultural labourers who worked someone else's land for money. Additionally, 8.51% were classified as household industry workers. Most workers (63.09%) were classified as other workers. The workforce was mostly male, with 1,827 male and 148 female workers in Ramgarh.

For rural areas of Ramgarh block, the sex ratio was 929; among 0-6 year olds, it was 926. Members of scheduled castes made up 22.62% of rural residents, and members of scheduled tribes made up 0.62%. The rural literacy rate was 72.29% (82.24% among men and 61.58% among women).

Most of Ramgarh block's rural workforce was employed in agriculture in 2011, with 30.26% being cultivators and another 49.75% being agricultural labourers. 5.52% were household industry workers, and the remaining 14.48% were other workers. The rural workforce was mostly male, consisting of 28,978 men and 11,926 women.

Amenities 
As of 2011, firefighting services in Ramgarh was covered by the Bhabua fire department. For electricity, Ramgarh had 495 households connected to the power grid that year, 0 commercial or industrial connections, and no electric street lights. Both open and closed were used Ramgarh, and there were 0 latrines.

Villages 
Besides the town of Ramgarh, there are 125 rural villages in Ramgarh block, as listed below:

See also 
 Ramgarh, Kaimur (Vidhan Sabha constituency)

References 

Cities and towns in Kaimur district